Selside and Fawcett Forest is a civil parish in the South Lakeland district, in the county of Cumbria, England. It was created on 1 April 2020, from the civil parishes of Fawcett Forest and Whitwell and Selside. It borders the parishes of Skelsmergh and Scalthwaiterigg, Longsleddale, Shap Rural, Orton, Whinfell and Strickland Roger.

The population of "Whitwell and Selside" in the 2011 United Kingdom census was 296, but data for Fawcett Forest is unavailable.

See also
Listed buildings in Selside and Fawcett Forest

References 

Civil parishes in Cumbria
South Lakeland District